Philcon, also known as the "Philadelphia Science Fiction Conference", is an annual three-day science fiction convention held at the Doubletree by Hilton Hotel in Cherry Hill, New Jersey (formerly the Crowne Plaza Hotel). The convention is run by the Philadelphia Science Fiction Society (PSFS).

History 
In 1936, a half dozen fans came down from New York by train for the first intercity meeting of fans ever held.  A picture taken of the group at Independence Hall has appeared in a number of the  histories of science fiction fandom.  They held a business meeting at the house of Philadelphia fan Milton A. Rothman, electing Rothman as chair and New Yorker Frederik Pohl as Secretary.  Since Philadelphia had been the site of the 1936 Democratic and Republican National Conventions, they declared themselves the Philadelphia Science Fiction Convention.  Part of the group went to John Baltadonis' home to examine his art collection and the printing press used to publish the PSFS newsletter.  At Rothman's house, the group talked about science fiction and played craps.  On the way back to the train station, some of the attendees sang early filk songs.  One of the attendees, John B. Michel published an account of the day, the first convention report, in a New York fanzine:

Some fan historians claim that the 1936 Philadelphia Science Fiction Conference, a.k.a. Philcon, was the first  science fiction convention ever held. Others, such as Fred Patten and Rob Hansen, make this claim for the January 1937 event in Leeds, England, organized by the Leeds Science Fiction League, which was specifically organised as a conference, with a program and speakers. Out of this came the first incarnation of the  British Science Fiction Association.

Philcon in 2020 held a virtual convention due to the COVID-19 pandemic.

Philcon Worldcons 
The World Science Fiction Convention, or Worldcon, has been held in Philadelphia three times:
 The 5th World Science Fiction Convention, called Philcon I, was held in 1947.
 The 11th World Science Fiction Convention, called Philcon II, was held in 1953.
 The 59th World Science Fiction Convention, called the Millennium Philcon, was held in 2001.

References 

Bristol, John (Jack Speer), Fancyclopedia, Fantasy Foundation, 1944.
Eney, Dick, Fancyclopedia II, Operation Crifanac 1959.
Pohl, Frederick, The Way the Future Was: A Memoir, Del Rey Books, 1978.
Moskowitz, Sam, The Immortal Storm, Hyperion Press, 1974.
Wolkoff, Lew, The First Philcon: An Oral History, Phanadelphia Corporation, 1985.

Other Related News Articles
The Secret Seven: Fans at the First Modern Science Fiction Con Had the Right Stuff Bleeding Cool, Retrieved 2020-10-06

External links 
Philcon Website

Science fiction conventions in the United States
1936 establishments in Pennsylvania
Recurring events established in 1936
Festivals established in 1936
Annual events in New Jersey
Conventions in New Jersey
Festivals in New Jersey
New Jersey culture
Tourist attractions in New Jersey
Cherry Hill, New Jersey